The Visa-Bikar 2005 was the forty-sixth season of the Icelandic national football cup. It started on May 17, 2005 and concluded with the Final held on September 24, 2005. The winners qualified for the first qualifying round of the UEFA Cup 2006–07.

First round

1 Match awarded 3–0 to Augnablik. Originally 4–2 to Africa.

Second round

Third round

Fourth round

Quarterfinals

Semifinals

Final

External links
 RSSSF Page

2005 domestic association football cups
2005 in Icelandic football
2005